Enteng Kabisote 10 and the Abangers is a 2016 Filipino superhero fantasy comedy film and the tenth film installment of the Filipino television sitcom Okay Ka, Fairy Ko!. The film was announced in August 2016 with Marlon N. Rivera and Tony Y. Reyes attached as directors.

The film was submitted as an entry for the 2016 Metro Manila Film Festival but was not included as a finalist. It will be the first Okay Ka, Fairy Ko! / Enteng Kabisote film that will not be featured in the film festival. The film was released in theaters on November 30, 2016, together with The Super Parental Guardians.

Plot
Enteng Kabisote (Vic Sotto) has been living the comfortable life even without his other companions: Aiza (Aiza Seguerra), who is living in a faraway town; his wife Faye (Pauleen Luna) still in Encantadia; and Amy (Ruby Rodriguez) and her husband gone. But he was torn between his son Benok (Oyo Boy Sotto) and his pampered grandson (Alonzo Muhlach). He argues with Benok over who is right to raise his own son and goes to Bohol to tour it, meeting a member of "Abangers" who has the power of iron. He approaches a hotel attendant Georgia (Ryza Cenon) and Nicomaine (Maine Mendoza) and thinks the tour guide Richard (Alden Richards) is a handsome man,  but disappointed, he continues the tour.

Three old triplets (Jose Manalo), (Wally Bayola) and (Paolo Ballesteros) run a factory until the workers go into a strike and are exiled as punishment.

Kwak Kwak (Epy Quizon)  is one of those so-called OEWs that is banished by the leaders, hatches a plan to eliminate the Abangers and eventually Enteng so that his vengeance will be complete. He has sidekicks with duckfaces and other of his minions who are also Encantados who were exiles.

Enteng was given a powered suit by the Abangers when they meet, but Kwak Kwak and his minions attacks and captures him and the group. They are put in stasis when Enteng pleads with the scientist to renege. The group later faces and defeats Kwak Kwak and his minions.

The closing scenes depict what happened to the Abangers: one (Jerald Napoles) has owned a gym, another (Sinon Lloresca) became a comedy bar owner; another (Cacai Bautista) built a fortune teller shop in Makati that caters to the elite; the three Lolas became Eat Bulaga!'''s characters (a nod from Kalyeserye's Explorer sisters); and the tour guide built his own shop. Enteng reunites with his family while talking to somebody on his phone.

Cast
Main cast
 Vic Sotto as Enteng Kabisote
 Epi Quizon as Doctor Kwak Kwak
 Oyo Boy Sotto as Benok Kabisote

Supporting cast
 Jose Manalo as Tinids/Lola Tinidora
 Wally Bayola as Nini/Lola Nidora
 Paolo Ballesteros as Tidi/Lola Tidora
 Ryzza Mae Dizon as Bubu 
 Bea Binene as Allaine/A2
 Alonzo Muhlach as Benokis Kabisote
 Ken Chan as Allan/A1
 Ryza Cenon as Ruth  
 Cacai Bautista as Ora/Oring
 Jerald Napoles as Lucas Malakas
 Jelson Bay as Remo/Remy
 Sinon Loresca, Jr. as Beki/Bistika
 Atak as Bibe 
 Max Collins as Bubu's Mother

Special participation
Joey de Leon as Pandoy
Alden Richards as Richard/Aldrin
Maine Mendoza as Nicomaine/Divina
Pauleen Luna-Sotto as Faye Kabisote
Aiza Seguerra as Aiza Kabisote
Mikylla Ramirez as Ada Kabisote
John Feir as Security Guard#1
Mike "Pekto" Nacua as Security Guard #2
Ate Gay
Pilita Corrales
Freddie Webb
Allan K as Fake Faye
Jaya as Herself
Ervic Vijandre as Cute Guy at the airport

Production

Development
On August 10, 2016, a story conference was held announcing the return of Enteng Kabisote in the silver screen. The film was meant to be an entry in the 2016 Metro Manila Film Festival. Marlon N. Rivera and Tony Y. Reyes directed the film while Orly Ilacad served as co–producer. In the conference, Sotto revealed that he had second thoughts on joining the 44nd annual Metro Manila Film Festival after changes were made for the selection of the competing entries and several cast members were revealed.Enteng Kabisote 10 and the Abangers is the tenth installment in the Okay Ka, Fairy Ko!/Enteng Kabisote film franchise after two Okay Ka, Fairy Ko! films, four Enteng Kabisote films and three spin-off/crossover movies. According to Sotto, Enteng Kabisote 10 and the Abangers will have a different story and better special effects than the previous Enteng Kabisote films. He also stated that the story and characters in the film will be more "millennial".

Filming
Principal photography for the film commenced on August 9, 2016.

Release
Critical reception
The film was poorly received by critics. Writing for CNN Philippines, critic Aldrin Calimlim comments that the film "seems resigned to reusing Internet memes well past their sell-by date and recycling old jokes," and adding that it's "[M]ore buggy than funny." Oggs Cruz of Rappler said, "[T]he movie never picks up. It doesn’t get remotely exciting. Everything remains inane and pointless. Simply put, Enteng Kabisote 10 and the Abangers'' is old, more of the same – and the franchise deserves to be put to rest."

Box Office
The movie was shown on November 30, 2016, together with Star Cinema's The Super Parental Guardians. With 257 cinemas, the movie earned  on its first day. The movie earned a disappointing  despite that it was shown from November 30, 2016, to January 3, 2017.

See also
 Okay Ka, Fairy Ko! (film series)

References

External links
 

Enteng Kabisote
2016 films
Philippine fantasy comedy films
2010s fantasy comedy films
OctoArts Films films
Films directed by Tony Y. Reyes
Films directed by Marlon N. Rivera